Paul Theodore Englund (March 25, 1938 – January 12, 2019) was an American biochemist known for his work with parasites, and especially his research into the genetic material in the parasitic organisms that cause African trypanosomiasis, more commonly called sleeping sickness.

Early life and education 
Born in Worcester, Massachusetts, to Theodore, a mechanical engineer father, and Mildred, a homemaker mother, Englund grew up alongside brother Donald, a teacher and Robert, a doctor, as well as his cousin, the artist Joyce Reopel. He went on to study chemistry at Hamilton College, graduating in 1960; he then earned his doctorate in biochemistry at Rockefeller University, graduating in 1966. At the latter school, he studied with Nobel nominee Lyman C. Craig.

Career 
He received funding from the National Institutes of Health for his postdoctoral fellowship at the Stanford University School of Medicine where he studied with Nobel laureate Arthur Kornberg. Englund was later recruited to join the Johns Hopkins School of Medicine faculty, where he stayed for more than 40 years until retiring as professor emeritus. In addition to his work there, he also taught a class in the biology of parasitism at the famed Marine Biological Laboratory in Woods Hole, Massachusetts, and held a position as a visiting scientist at the International Laboratory for Research on Animal Diseases in Kenya. In 2012, Englund was elected to the National Academy of Sciences. In 2016, an anonymous donor established the Paul and Christine Englund Professorship at the Johns Hopkins School of Medicine in the Englunds' honor.

A prolific researcher, Englund published more than 190 scholarly articles, and his work has been cited more than 10,000 times. He is best known for his work with African trypanosomiasis, a potentially fatal disease that infects both human and animals, which is spread by the tse-tse fly in sub-Saharan Africa. Englund's focus was on researching the structure and function of the genetic material in trypanosomes, the parasites that also lend their name to the disease. As the Johns Hopkins School of Medicine explained in their obituary:One focus of his research was GPI anchors. Composed mainly of sugars and fats, GPIs hold proteins to cell surfaces in all animals and are especially abundant in trypanosomes. In searching for the source of GPIs, he discovered a unique way that fatty acids are made in trypanosomes that is not found in other organisms. During his research career, Englund authored nearly 190 journal articles.

Personal life 
Englund died of Parkinson's disease on January 12, 2019.

Awards and memberships 

 Member of the National Academy of Sciences (elected 2012)
 Member of the American Society for Biochemistry and Molecular Biology 
 Member of the American Association for the Advancement of Science

External links 

 Chemistry Tree: Paul T. Englund - Publications
 Letter from Arthur Kornberg to Paul England — Arthur Kornberg — Profiles in Science
Paul Englund — Researchgate
Paul Englund: Special Programme for Research & Training in Tropical Diseases Collaboration Network

References

1938 births
2019 deaths
Scientists from Massachusetts
People from Worcester, Massachusetts
Johns Hopkins University faculty
Hamilton College (New York) alumni
Rockefeller University alumni
American biochemists
Members of the United States National Academy of Sciences